Festival of Festivals may refer to:

 Asti's Festival of Festivals, an annual celebration of country life held in Asti, Italy
 Festival of Festivals, Saint Petersburg, a film festival held in St Petersburg, Russia
 Toronto International Film Festival, formerly Toronto Festival of Festivals, a film festival held in Toronto, Canada